Auburn House is a historic home located on the grounds of Towson University in Towson, Baltimore County, Maryland, United States. It was built in 1790 by Charles Ridgely III and stayed in the family until it became part of the Sheppard and Enoch Pratt Hospital property in 1944.  Towson University (then Towson State College) acquired it in 1971.

The building currently serves as the home of the executive offices of the Department of Athletics.

The National Register listing shows it having been built in 1849, but it also says that Rebecca Dorsey Ridgely, wife of Charles Ridgely III, lived there from 1791 to 1812. The listing calls it Greek Revival, but 1791 is well before the Greek Revival period in the United States.  Towson University calls it "an important example of Italianate–Federal architecture".

It is a rectangular three story stone structure faced with scored stucco.  The front is three bays, with ground floor windows, six over nine, the full height of the front door.  The next story is also six over nine, but not as tall, and the top floor windows are the same size as the upper sash of the floor below. The interior is elegant, including acanthus pattern cornices, Italian marble mantels, graceful chandeliers, and a carved mahogany balustrade.  The two story addition on the southwest side was built in the 1920s.

Auburn House was added to the National Register of Historic Places on March 17, 1975, reference number 75000869.

Gallery

References

External links

Houses on the National Register of Historic Places in Maryland
Houses in Baltimore County, Maryland
Greek Revival houses in Maryland
Houses completed in 1790
National Register of Historic Places in Baltimore County, Maryland
1790 establishments in Maryland
Towson University